The Secretariat of State for Justice, Information & Research of San Marino (or Ministry of Justice) implements the policies concerning justice set out in the government program. In particular, the ministry has the following duties:

 Supervise the work of the court’s Judicial Offices by issuing orders and directives to improve their organisation and ensure their proper functioning
 Supervise the operation of the State prison through the Gendarmerie, which is responsible for managing the facility and the inmates.
 Monitor professional associations
Submit draft laws and decisions in the field of justice to the Congress of State

List of secretariats

Secretariat of Justice, Relations with Local Governments, & Information 

 Pier Marino Menicucci (2001-2002)
Tito Masi (2002)

Secretariat of Justice, Relations with Local Governments, & Information 

Alberto Cecchetti (2003-2006)

Secretariat of Justice, Information & Peace 

 Ivan Foschi (2006-2010)

Secretariat of Justice, Information & Research 

Augusto Casali (2010-present)

See also 
 Justice ministry
 Politics of San Marino

References 

Justice ministries
Government of San Marino